Commentaries on American Law is a four-volume book by James Kent. It was adapted from his lectures at Columbia Law School starting in 1794. It was first published in 1826 by O. Halsted and has been reprinted and revised many times since. A twelfth edition was edited by Oliver Wendell Holmes, Jr. A fourteenth edition edited by John M. Gould was published in 1896, and a fifteenth edition edited by Jon Roland was published 1997-2002.

Reviews
In 1847, commenting on the fifth edition, J. G. Marvin said:

References

Law books